Field is an unincorporated community of approximately 169 people located in the Kicking Horse River valley of southeastern British Columbia,
Canada, within the confines of Yoho National Park. The community is named for Cyrus West Field of Transatlantic telegraph cable fame, who visited the area in 1884.

Demographics 
In 2011, Field had a population of 195 year-round residents.

Townsite administration 

Field's land ownership was split between the Crown and the Canadian Pacific Railway (CPR), with the border between the two jurisdictions being Stephen Avenue. The railway was in charge of the water and electricity supply for the town until the 1950s, when the Canadian government took over. Today, the townsite is managed by Parks Canada. Local residents lease their land from the park administration, with a term of 42 years.

Burgess Shale 

CPR track workers in Field discovered the fossils of the Burgess Shale. Commonly called by the workers "the stone bugs", the first fossils were discovered on Mount Stephen. In 1909, Charles D. Walcott discovered the Walcott Quarry on the slope of Mount Field.

References

External links 

Field.ca - Information for people traveling to Field and Yoho National Park
Fieldbc.ca - Community website and history of the town
Friends of Yoho - The Friends of Yoho National Park Society promote appreciation, understanding and stewardship of the ecology and culture of Yoho National Park
BC Archives Photo: Mount Stephen Hotel and CPR Station in Field, 1905

Designated places in British Columbia
Yoho National Park
Unincorporated settlements in British Columbia
Canadian Pacific Railway stations in British Columbia
Columbia Country
Populated places in the Columbia-Shuswap Regional District